The Essential Daryl Braithwaite is a re-mastered greatest hits album by Australian singer-songwriter Daryl Braithwaite. The album focuses on his output from the late 1980s onwards.

Track listing
 "As the Days Go By" – 4:03
 "All I Do" – 4:05
 "One Summer" – 3:43
 "Let Me Be" – 5:36
 "Sugar Train" – 3:43
 "Rise" – 3:56
 "The Horses" – 4:15
 "Higher Than Hope" – 4:26
 "Don't Hold Back Your Love" – 5:09
 "Nothing to Lose" – 4:09
 "Ghost There Waiting" – 2:55
 "Waters Rising" – 4:25
 "Modern Times" – 5:12
 "Ain't No Angels" (by Company of Strangers) – 4:05
 "The World as It Is" – 3:49
 "Barren Ground" – 5:13
 "As the Days Go By" (extended mix) – 5:06
 "The Horses" (acoustic version) – 4:15

Release history

References

External links

Daryl Braithwaite albums
Compilation albums by Australian artists
2007 greatest hits albums
Sony Music Australia albums